Arson Anthem was an American hardcore punk band formed in New Orleans, Louisiana, in 2006. The lineup comprised singer Mike Williams of Eyehategod, guitarist Phil Anselmo (best known as the vocalist for Pantera and Down), country musician, punk rocker and Assjack frontman Hank Williams III on drums, and bassist Collin Yeo.

After losing all his possessions in the aftermath of Hurricane Katrina, Mike Williams moved into Anselmo's spare apartment. The two spent countless hours listening to Phil’s collection of early hardcore bands. They began jamming with Hank III and Collin Yeo, who were united by their desire to have a hardcore punk band of their very own.

According to Williams, the group spent six days in Houston, Texas recording eight songs in the spring of 2006. Their self-titled debut EP was released on February 19, 2008.

The 2010 album Insecurity Notoriety received a nod from Exclaim! for the No. 7 Metal Album of the Year.

When asked in an interview on July 17, 2013 if anything new would happen with Arson Anthem, Anselmo said "Arson? No. There's probably nothing new going to happen with Arson but, it was fun to do while it lasted, and once again yeah given the circumstance the singer for Arson Anthem is also the singer for Eyehategod and I know that they have a tour coming up that's going to last them about 5 weeks in Europe and they just got through tracking their new album over here at the studio, so hopefully there's a great chance that I get to mix that record and be a part of that record. So Arson, like I said is one of many side projects that I've done in the past but as for right now nah, there's nothing left to do."

Members
Mike Williams – vocals
Phil Anselmo – guitar
Collin Yeo – bass
Hank Williams III – drums

Discography

Studio albums
Insecurity Notoriety (October 12, 2010)

Extended plays
Arson Anthem (February 19, 2008)

Compilations
Housecore Records Compilation Volume 1 (2009) (track "Crippled Life")

References

External links
 Metal Underground Article on Arson Anthem

American hardcore punk groups
Musical groups from New Orleans